A  (also romanized as  ) is a third-level administrative division of Iran. While sometimes translated as "county," it is more accurately translated as "district," similar to a township in the United States or a district of England.

In Iran, the provinces (first-level divisions) (استان, ostān) consist of several counties (second-level divisions)  (شهرستان, shahrestān), and the counties consist of one or more districts (third-level divisions) (بخش, bakhsh). A district consists of a combination of cities (شهر shahr) and rural districts (دهستان, dehestān) (fourth-level divisions). The official governor of a district is called a bakhshdar, the head of the bakhshdari office. Rural districts are a collection of villages and their surrounding lands. One of the cities of the county is named its capital.

To better understand such subdivisions, the following table may be helpful. Below is the 2006 structure of Khash County, one of the 26 counties that constitute Sistan and Baluchestan province.
The Central District contained five rural districts and one city, the capital
Irandegan District contained two rural districts and no cities
Nukabad District contained four rural districts and one city

It can also be seen that districts may occasionally be separated from the county to become counties of their own. In this particular case, Nukabad District separated on 14 December 2018 to become Taftan County, after which the city of Nukabad was elevated to capital status within the newly created Central District of Taftan.

References

Subdivisions of Iran

Types of administrative division